The Maxim M/09-21 is a Maxim machine gun variant made by Finland and used by the Finnish army during World War II.

History 
The Finnish Civil War in 1918 led to Finland becoming an independent democratic republic. The new Finnish army needed a machine gun to distribute to its troops. The most easily accessible machine guns were Russian PM M1910 Maxim machine guns captured during the civil war, but the wheeled mounts the machine guns used were unsuited to Finnish terrain which was mainly forests. Finland decided to make their own Maxim variant, more suited to the Finnish terrain, by developing a tripod and then mounting a Russian Maxim machine gun on it. The tripod, which would be ready for production in 1921, was derived from to the one on the DWM's MG 09 machine gun (the export version of the MG 08 machine gun) which Finland had used successfully during the civil war.

Design 

Finnish changes to the original Russian Maxim included manufacturing modifications and a simplified gunsight which changed the sight measurements to the metric system.  The tripod mount could fold for easier carrying and had metal carrying handles on each of the two front legs.

References 

Firearms of Finland
World War II military equipment of Finland
Machine guns of Finland